Dulov is a village and municipality in the Ilava District of  the Trenčín Region of Slovakia.

Genealogical resources

The records for genealogical research are available at the state archive "Statny Archiv in Bytca, Slovakia"

 Roman Catholic church records (births/marriages/deaths): 1671-1918 (parish B)

See also
 List of municipalities and towns in Slovakia

References

External links
  Official page
Surnames of living people in Dulov

Villages and municipalities in Ilava District